Hillevi Larsson (born 3 September 1974) is a Swedish social democratic politician who has been a member of the Riksdag since 2004.

References

External links
Hillevi Larsson at the Riksdag website

1974 births
Living people
Members of the Riksdag from the Social Democrats
Women members of the Riksdag
Swedish republicans
Members of the Riksdag 2002–2006
Members of the Riksdag 2006–2010
Members of the Riksdag 2010–2014
Members of the Riksdag 2014–2018
Members of the Riksdag 2018–2022
21st-century Swedish women politicians